Worth County is the name of three counties in the United States:

Worth County, Georgia
Worth County, Iowa
Worth County, Missouri